Chaffee or Chafee may refer to:

Places

United States
 Chaffee, Missouri, a city
 Chaffee, New York, a hamlet
 Chaffee, North Dakota, an unincorporated community
 Chaffee, West Virginia, an extinct town
 Chaffee County, Colorado
 Lake Chaffee, Connecticut
 Lake Chaffee (CDP), Connecticut, lakeside community

Outer space
 Chaffee (crater), on the far side of the Moon
 Chaffee Hill, unofficial name of one of the Apollo 1 Hills on Mars

In the military
M24 Chaffee, a World War II and later light tank
Fort Chaffee Maneuver Training Center, Arkansas, previously named Camp Chaffee, then Fort Chaffee
 (DDG-90), a guided missile destroyer
, a World War II destroyer escort

People
Chaffee (surname), a list of people with the surname Chaffee or Chafee

Other uses
 Fresno Chaffee Zoo, Fresno, California
 Chaffee Art Center, Rutland, Vermont

See also
Roger B. Chaffee Planetarium
Loomis Chaffee, a school in Windsor, Connecticut